An Emergency wreck buoy is used to warn of a new wreck which has not yet been listed in maritime documents.  The buoy is expected to be deployed for the first 24-72 hours after the wreck occurs.  After that time more permanent buoyage (such as isolated danger marks or cardinal marks) should be deployed and charts updated.

The buoy is designed to "provide a clear and unambiguous" mark of a new and uncharted danger.  The buoy is painted with 4, 6 or 8 vertical stripes of alternate yellow and blue.  In addition it may have the word "WRECK" painted on it.  Optionally it may carry a vertical (St. George's) cross painted yellow.  The light flashes alternate yellow and blue for one second each with a half second gap between.  No other navigation mark uses blue.

See also

 Navigation
 Lateral mark
 Cardinal mark
 Safe water mark
 Special mark
 Isolated danger mark

References

Nautical terminology
Navigational buoys